Bijajica is a Brazilian cookie, popular in the state of Santa Catarina. Produced on the mountainous plateau region of Lages, its ingredients are cassava starch, eggs and sugar, all fried in lard.

See also
 List of Brazilian sweets and desserts

References

External links 
 Bijajica Slow Food Brasil

Brazilian confectionery
Cassava dishes
Biscuits